Murarhalli is a village in Dharwad district of Karnataka, India.

Demographics 
As of the 2011 Census of India there were 111 households in Murarhalli and a total population of 558 consisting of 276 males and 282 females. There were 68 children ages 0-6.

References

Villages in Dharwad district